Jerome de Bromhead (born 2 December 1945) is an Irish composer, classical guitarist, and member of Aosdána.

Biography
Jerome de Bromhead was born in Waterford, Ireland. He studied with A.J. Potter and James Wilson at the Royal Irish Academy of Music in Dublin, with further studies with Seóirse Bodley in 1975 and Franco Donatoni in 1978. He holds an M.A. in music, art history and English from Trinity College Dublin. As a guitarist, he studied with Elspeth Henry (1967–68) and at the Guitar Centre, London (1969). He worked in RTÉ as a television news director and announcer, as well as a senior music producer for radio, until a serious accident forced him to retire in 1996. He currently lives in Dublin.

Music
His compositions include works for solo guitar as well as orchestral, choral and chamber music. His Symphony No. 1 (1986) represented Ireland at the International Rostrum of Composers at UNESCO in Paris. He describes his style as "neither a Postmodernist nor a deaf-as-a-postmodernist. Above all I am suspicious of anything that seems like dogma."

His harpsichord piece Flux (1981) was performed at the ISCM World Music Days in Germany in 1987 and is now published by Tonos Verlag of Darmstadt.

According to guitarist John Feeley, de Bromhead's solo guitar composition Gemini (1970) is "a sophisticated work, both technically and compositionally. It has the dynamism of youth, with a sense of freshness and it projects an attractive, driving energy [...] It is an effective concert work, which speaks well on the instrument and is particularly gratifying for the performer."

Selected works

Orchestral
Abstract Variations (1976)
Danzostinata (1978)
Venti Eventi (1978)
Symphony No. 1 (1985)
Concerto for Guitar and Strings (1991, rev. 1997)
Symphony No. 2 (1994)
Violin Concerto No. 1 (2008)
Corkamesca (2014) for string orchestra
A Lay for a Light Year (2014)

Chamber music
Frenetics (1971) for 5 saxophones, 3 trumpets, 3 trombones, piano, guitar, drumkit, double bass
String Quartet No. 1 (1971)
Rotastasis (1975) for 2 flutes, 2 clarinets, 2 violins, viola, cello, guitar
Parameters (1976) for flute, clarinet, bassoon, violin, cello, piano
String Quartet No. 2 (1977)
Prelude for Viola and Piano (1977)
Brass Quintet No. 1 (1979)
Magister (1981) for flute, oboe, clarinet, bassoon, 2 violins, viola, cello
Vespertine (1981) for flute and guitar
Wind Quintet (1983)
Quondam (1985) for flute, violin, viola, piano
Brass Quintet No. 2 (1986)
Torna un Suono (1992) for oboe, viola, cello
Gym (1999) for mixed ensemble (10 musicians)
Serenade (2005) for oboe/clarinet and double bass
Baroque Restorations (2006) for accordion and piano
Augury (2009) for violin and guitar
Few Get to the Orient (2009) for 4 percussionists
Noon (2009) for clarinet and piano
Brass Canons (2014) for 4 trumpets, 4 horns, 3 trombones, euphonium, tuba
Farewell Fair Friend (2014) for flute, clarinet, accordion, violin, cello

Solo instrumental
Anno (1969) for guitar
Gemini (1970) for guitar
Benthos (1974) for piano
Xasolos (1975) for any treble instrument
Moto Impetuo (1977) for organ
Flux (1981) for harpsichord
Undulations (1984) for piano
Three Fresh Pieces (1989) for piano
Two Ladies Dancing (1998) film score, for piano
Guitar Sonata No. 1 (1999)
Gerousia (2006) for guitar
Charlie's Lonesome Violin Blues (2009) for violin
Fright Fight or Flight (2009) for viola
Party Games (2009) for violin
Pseudo Fugue and Presumptuous Postlude (2009) for cello

Vocal
Dirge from Donne's Devotions (1975) for mixed choir
Bláth an Aitinn (1976) for mixed choir
Iomramh (1978) for mixed choir
Hy Brasil (1980) for soprano, alto, tenor, bass, mixed choir, small orchestra
Joy (1982) for soprano, baritone, mixed choir
Music for No Myth (1992) for mezzo, spoken chorus, flute, horn, percussion, 2 violins, viola, cello
New Lands (1993) for soprano, mezzo, baritone, piano
The Assize of Sighs (1993) for mezzo and piano
Clear Light and Thunder (1996) for medium voice and piano
Lynch Triptych (1998) for mixed choir
Ring Out Ring In (2006) for mixed choir
Bridal Song (2008) for mezzo, tenor, bass (solos)
In Youth is Pleasure (2008) for mezzo, tenor, bass (solos)
My Prime of Youth (2008) for mezzo, tenor, bass (solos)
The Dawning (2008) for mixed choir
The Quip (2008) for mixed choir
Love's Gleaning Tide (2009) for mixed choir
Our Hands Have Met (2009) for mixed choir
Not Yet Begun (2011), versions for a) soprano, viola, cello, double bass; or b) soprano, clarinet, violin, piano
I Breathe a Drug (2013) for soprano, cello, organ
Gaelic Prayer (2014) for mixed choir

Scores
The Contemporary Music Centre (Ireland) provides scores and sample recordings of a selection of de Bromhead's works, available here.

Recordings
Gemini: Black Box Music BBM 1002 (CD, 1998), performed by John Feeley (guitar).
Violin Concerto; Symphony No. 2; A Lay for a Light Year: Toccata Classics TOCC 0422 (CD, 2017), performed by Alan Smale (violin), RTÉ National Symphony Orchestra, Colman Pearce (conductor).

References

External links
 Representation with the Contemporary Music Centre, Dublin
 De Bromhead page with Aosdana

1945 births
20th-century classical composers
Alumni of the Royal Irish Academy of Music
Aosdána members
Composers for the classical guitar
Irish classical composers
Irish classical guitarists
Living people
Musicians from County Waterford